Legend of the Amazon Women is a beat 'em up video game developed by SilverTime and published by U.S. Gold and Mastertronic for Amstrad CPC, Commodore 64, and ZX Spectrum in 1986.

Plot
Stranded in the middle of the jungle after a terrible plane crash, your child has been stolen by a tribe of Amazon Warriors, who want to raise her as one of their own. You must fight your way through the jungle past Amazons armed with clubs, swords and axes avoiding the many arrows, in order to rescue your daughter.

You [sic] goal is to fight your way through the ten zones and rescue the stolen child. The Amazons will do their best to stop you. They will fight you one at a time, though they constantly fire arrows at you which you need to avoid by jumping or ducking. As you progress through the game the Amazons will get more intelligent and harder to defeat.

You have a limited time to complete each zone, if you fail to reach the end of the zone before your time runs out you lose a life.

Gameplay

Reception

See also
Flight of the Amazon Queen

References

External links 
 Legend of the Amazon Women resources at World of Spectrum
 Legend of the Amazon Women at Your Sinclair

1986 video games
Amstrad CPC games
Beat 'em ups
Commodore 64 games
Video games developed in the United Kingdom
Video games featuring female protagonists
ZX Spectrum games
Mastertronic games
U.S. Gold games